Mohammad Mokhtari may refer to:

 Mohammad Mokhtari (writer) (1942–1998), Iranian poet
 Mohammad Mokhtari (protester) (1989–2011), Iranian university student
 Mohammad Mokhtari (footballer) (born 1984), Iranian footballer